The Broken Spur cocktail is a mixed drink with white port, vermouth, gin, egg yolk and a splash of anisette for flavor. The recipe is found in The Savoy Cocktail Book. Some recipes replace the anisette with Pernod. The cocktail is shaken with ice and served in a coupé glass garnished with a twist of lemon peel or dusted with freshly grated nutmeg.

References

Cocktails with gin
Cocktails with vermouth
Cocktails with anise-flavored liquors
Cocktails with eggs